The Apostolic Vicariate of Alexandria of Egypt, or in full  - of Alexandria of Egypt-Heliopolis-Port Said is the Roman Catholic Apostolic vicariate (missionary ordinariate) in Egypt, named after its cathedral see in Alexandria, a port city and former Catholic patriarchate.
 
It is exempt, i.e. directly subject to the Holy See, not part of any ecclesiastical province.

Special Churches 
 the cathedral episcopal see in Alexandria, Saint Catherine.
 the co-cathedral and former cathedral Notre-Dame of Heliopolis, in Egypt's metropolitan national capital Cairo's suburb Heliopolis, formerly seat of a separate apostolic vicariate Heliopolis in northern Egypt
 the co-cathedral and former cathedral Our Lady and St. Michael, in Port Said, formerly seat of a separate apostolic vicariate in southern Egypt
 Basilica of St Therese of the Child Jesus, Cairo, a minor basilica.

History 
 Established on May 18, 1839 as Apostolic Vicariate of Egypt and Arabia, on territory split off from the Apostolic Vicariate of Aleppo in Syria, then covering vast territory in Africa and Arabia 
 Lost territory to establish the Apostolic Prefecture of Jedda in 1840 and again on 1846.04.03 to establish the Apostolic Vicariate of Central Africa
 Renamed as Apostolic Vicariate of Egypt in 1851
 Lost territory on several occasions to establish 
 Coptic Catholic Diocese of Iskanderiya (Alexandria) in 1895
 Apostolic Prefecture of the Nile Delta on 1886.01.25
 Apostolic Prefecture of Eritrea on 1894.09.13 
 the Coptic Catholic Patriarchal See of Alexandria, Coptic Catholic Diocese of Luqsor and Coptic Catholic Diocese of Minya on 1895.11.26
 Apostolic Vicariate of Canal of Suez on 1926.07.12
It was on 27 January 1951 as Apostolic Vicariate of Alexandria of Egypt.
Pope John Paul II visited in February 2000, Pope Francis in April 2017.

United titles 
Its full title reflects the (re)absorption of two former Latin Church missionary circonscriptions in Egypt :
 the northern Apostolic Vicariate of Heliopolis in Egypt (Eliopoli di Egitto) (since November 30, 1987), which had a see in the Cairo suburb it's named after 
 the southern Apostolic Vicariate of Port-Said (since November 30, 1987), which had a see in the port city on the Suez Canal

Episcopal incumbents 
All vicars were Latin Church titular bishops and members of religious orders
 Apostolic Vicars of Egypt
Until 1921, the Apostolic Vicar was also the Holy See's Apostolic Delegate to Egypt and Arabia.
 Bishop Perpetuo Guasco da Solero, O.F.M. Obs. (1839.06.07 – 1859.08.02)
 Bishop Paškal Vuičić, O.F.M. Obs. (1860.09.28 – 1866.08.06)
 Archbishop Ljudevit Ćurčija, (O.F.M.) (1866.07.27 – 1881.05.01)
 Archbishop Anacleto Chicaro, O.F.M. (1881.05.12 – 1888.10.05)
 Archbishop Aurelio Briante, O.F.M. (1904.07.23 – 1921.02)
 Bishop Félix Couturier, O.P. (1919.07.03 – 1921.06.28), who became Bishop of Alexandria in Ontario (Canada) (1921.06.28 – 1941.07.27)
 Bishop Igino Nuti, O.F.M. (1921.12.20 – 1945, followed by a four-year vacancy)

 Apostolic Vicars of Alexandria of Egypt 
 Jean de Capistran Aimé Cayer, O.F.M. (26 May 1949 – 13 April 1978)
 Egidio Sampieri, O.F.M. (29 April 1978 – 26 August 2000)
 Giuseppe Bausardo, S.D.B. (24 February 2001 – 29 October 2008)
 Apostolic Administrator Gennaro De Martino (29 October 2008 – 1 September 2009)
 Adel Zaky, O.F.M. (1 September 2009 – 21 July 2019)
 Apostolic Administrator Elia Eskandr Abd Elmalak, O.F.M. (29 September 2019 - 6 August 2020)
 Bishop-elect Claudio Lurati, M.C.C.J. (6 August 2020 -)

See also 
 List of Catholic dioceses in Egypt
 Catholic Church in Egypt

References

External links 
 GCatholic.org, with incumbent biography links 
 Catholic-Hierarchy entry 

Alexandria
Roman Catholic dioceses in Egypt
Religious organizations established in 1839
Christianity in Alexandria
Roman Catholic dioceses and prelatures established in the 19th century
1839 establishments in Egypt